Sir David Ernest Campbell Price (20 November 1924 – 31 January 2014) was a Conservative Party politician in the United Kingdom.

Price was educated at Eton College, Trinity College, Cambridge, and Yale University. He was President of the Cambridge Union in 1948.  He served with the Scots Guards during World War II, a staff officer in Trieste. He became an economist and industrial executive.

Price was the first Member of Parliament (MP) for Eastleigh, from the seat's creation in 1955 until his retirement in 1992, when he was succeeded by Stephen Milligan.

Price was British representative on the Consultative Assembly of the Council of Europe 1958-61 and became a junior minister at the Board of Trade in 1962. In 1964, he became opposition spokesman on education and science. From 1971 to 1972, Price served as a junior minister for Aerospace.

He was given the Freedom of the Borough of Eastleigh in 1977.

References

Times Guide to the House of Commons, 1987

1924 births
2014 deaths
Conservative Party (UK) MPs for English constituencies
Knights Bachelor
Ministers in the Macmillan and Douglas-Home governments, 1957–1964
Parliamentary Secretaries to the Board of Trade
People educated at Eton College
Politicians awarded knighthoods
Presidents of the Cambridge Union
Scots Guards officers
UK MPs 1955–1959
UK MPs 1959–1964
UK MPs 1964–1966
UK MPs 1966–1970
UK MPs 1970–1974
UK MPs 1974
UK MPs 1974–1979
UK MPs 1979–1983
UK MPs 1983–1987
UK MPs 1987–1992